Losing Ground is a semiautobiographical 1982 film written and directed by Kathleen Collins starring Seret Scott, Bill Gunn, and Duane Jones. It is the first feature-length drama directed by an African American woman since the 1920s and won First Prize at the Figueroa International Film Festival in Portugal.

In 2020, the film was selected for preservation in the National Film Registry by the Library of Congress as being "culturally, historically, or aesthetically significant".

Plot
Sara Rogers is a well-loved philosophy professor who teaches courses on logic. She is married to Victor, a successful painter. To celebrate the sale of one of his paintings to a museum, Victor decides to rent a house for the summer where he can paint. Sara is annoyed at his plan because she wanted to spend the summer in the city researching a paper she is writing on ecstatic experiences and knows that her access to books will be limited in a small town. She feels as though Victor doesn't value her work in academia compared to his work as an artist. Nevertheless, after finding a house they both adore she agrees to go with him for the summer.

At the rented house Victor becomes obsessed with painting local women, befriending one in particular, a Puerto Rican woman named Celia. Jealous, Sara goes back to the city for a few days to act in a student film that one of her students has begged her to participate in. She meets Duke, the filmmaker's uncle, who plays her love interest in the movie and who is immediately attracted to her.

Sara brings Duke up to the rented house, and Victor is immediately jealous of him. Victor is also jealous when his friend and mentor Carlos starts flirting with Celia. In the morning, seeing Victor aggressively playing around with Celia, Sara grows angry and tells him to stop his flirting in front of her. Leaving him, she talks to her mother saying she feels out of control and on shaky ground, despite being known for her steady, contemplative nature.

Returning to the city, Sara completes her final scenes for the film. Victor goes to find her and arrives to watch in time as her character shoots Duke's character for being unfaithful to her.

Cast
 Seret Scott as Sara Rogers
 Bill Gunn as Victor
 Duane Jones as Duke
 Billie Allen as Leila, Sara's Mother
 Gary Bolling as George
 Noberto Kerner as Carlos, Victor's friend
 Maritza Rivera as Celia

Production
Losing Ground was filmed in New York City and in Nyack, Piermont and Haverstraw in Rockland County, New York. The film had a budget of $125,000.

Response and legacy
Losing Ground did not have a theatrical release, and thus never played outside of the film festival circuit during Collins' lifetime — the director died in 1988 at the age of 46. The film was largely overlooked at that time.

In 2015, the film was restored by the filmmaker's daughter, Nina Collins, and reissued. In the same year, the film screened at Film Society of Lincoln Center, spurring critical and popular interest in the film. Critics raved about the film; Richard Brody of The New Yorker  wrote that "had it screened widely in its time, it would have marked film history." A.O. Scott of The New York Times wrote that the film "feels like news, like a bulletin from a vital and as-yet-unexplored dimension of reality." In The Stranger, Charles Mudede described the film as being "one of the most important and original American films of the second half of the 20th century."

In 2016, Milestone Films released the film on DVD and Blu-ray.

Losing Ground is currently streaming via the Criterion Channel.

See also 
1982 in film
List of female directors
African-American poetry

References

External links
 
 
 
 
 Losing Ground on MUBI
 Kathleen Collins interview at Criterion Channel

1982 films
1982 comedy-drama films
African-American films
American comedy-drama films
American independent films
Films set in New York (state)
Films shot in New York (state)
1982 independent films
United States National Film Registry films
1980s rediscovered films
1980s English-language films
1980s American films